Mylothris sulphurea, the sulphur dotted border, is a butterfly in the family Pieridae. It is found in eastern Nigeria and western Cameroon. The habitat consists of dense forests.

The larvae feed on Santalales species.

References

Seitz, A. Die Gross-Schmetterlinge der Erde 13: Die Afrikanischen Tagfalter. Plate XIII 10

Butterflies described in 1895
Pierini
Butterflies of Africa